Fantasy Squares Grid Sheets and Mapers Aid Template is a 1981 role-playing game supplement published by Harry's House.

Contents
Fantasy Squares Grid Sheets and Mapers Aid Template contains the Mapper's Aid template, which is a sheet of hard plastic 5" x 3 ", cut with holes which enable someone to accurately and quickly draw a variety of symbols with a very fine point pen or pencil.

Reception
Lewis Pulsipher reviewed Fantasy Squares Grid Sheets and Mapers Aid Template in The Space Gamer No. 48. Pulsipher commented that "Unless you intend to show off your maps as works of art, I don't see the need for this precision.  Almost anyone can draw a perfectly adequate circle, star, whatever quicker than he can use a template to help him draw one. The direction cross is particularly useless except for show.  For maps-as-'art' the template would be quite valuable."

References

Fantasy role-playing game supplements
Role-playing game mapping aids
Role-playing game supplements introduced in 1981